Operación Triunfo is a reality television talent show which first aired on Spain's TVE network in 2001. A music talent contest with viewer voting and reality show elements that originated Endemol's Star Academy franchise, the show aims to find the country's next solo singing sensation.

Operación Triunfo (also known as OT) first aired in 2001. On its first run between 2001 and 2004, three series were aired on TVE, which also served as the national final to select the Spanish entry for the Eurovision Song Contest. The first series of OT was particularly successful in ratings, becoming one of the most popular shows in the history of Spanish television and featuring singers that went on to enjoy long-term recognition from the public: notably Rosa López, David Bisbal, David Bustamante or Chenoa. After the third series, TVE decided not to renew the show and its rights were acquired by Telecinco, which aired series 5–8 of the series. Series 8 in 2011 was cancelled due to poor ratings and its finale was rushed as a result.

On 26 April 2017, RTVE approved a new series of the talent show produced by Gestmusic Endemol, returning to TVE after 13 years. The total cost of the series was €10.2 million. Due to its ratings success, it was renewed for a further series. This was the second most successful edition of the program to date, artists like Aitana, Ana Guerra, Amaia, Alfred García, Luis Cepeda, Agoney, Miriam Rodríguez or Lola Índigo have emerged from this edition.

Format
A selection of hopefuls is boarded in "The Academy", managed by a headmaster, where they are coached by various professionals in several artistic disciplines and are filmed with cameras (an idea borrowed from another of Endemol's major reality shows Big Brother). Once a week, the contestants have to face a prime time show, where they sing a cover version of a popular song they have prepared during the week before, as well as recapping their trials and tribulations at The Academy from the past week. The live show will often feature special guest stars, with whom some of the contestants have the opportunity to sing. Based on the judges' verdicts and viewer voting, the weakest contestant is dropped. The eventual winner is awarded a record deal and/or some amount of money.

Series overview

All contestants appearing above (1st to 6th) were born in Spain, except for Chenoa who is Argentinian-born (from series 1), Moritz Weisskopf who is German (series 5), Chipper Cooke who is from the United States (series 6), Brenda Mau who is from Peru (series 7), Alexandra Masangkay who is from the Philippines (series 8), winner of series 8 Nahuel Sachak who is from Paraguay, and winner of series 10 Famous Oberogo who is Nigerian-born.

Series 1 (2001–02)

All three finalists of the inaugural series released debut albums, but while Rosa (accompanied by some fellow contenders as backing singers) scored seventh place in the Eurovision Song Contest 2002 with the song "Europe's Living a Celebration", and had notable success with her albums, it was Bisbal who went on to international success, even winning a Latin Grammy Award for Best Newcomer for his album Corazón Latino.

Other participants of this first edition (Chenoa, Nuria Fergó and Manu Tenorio) also launched successful solo careers. In addition, Gisela was hired by Disney Spain and started a career in musical theater; and represented Andorra in the Eurovision Song Contest 2008.

Series 2 (2002–03)

The second series of Operación Triunfo became an anomaly in the category of popular reality TV music shows. First of all, the winner had very little success after the show. Second of all, many contestants who did not do well had massive success across Europe and Latin America, not just in Spain:

Beth was chosen to represent Spain in the Eurovision Song Contest 2003. She scored 8th place with the song "Dime".

The first person out of the show, Mai Meneses, rose to prominence in 2006 when herself and a childhood friend formed the band Nena Daconte. They released an album, He Perdido Los Zapatos, which was highly praised by critics. The album sold over 200,000 copies in Spain alone, an amazing feat as an average album to get to number 1 in Spain needs around 20,000 sales.

Vega, who came 9th, managed to release the best selling single of 2003 in Spain with her own composition, "iGrita!", with over one million copies sold.

Series 3 (2003–04)

Series three runner-up Ramón was chosen to represent Spain in the Eurovision Song Contest 2004. He scored 10th place with the song "Para llenarme de ti".

This was the last series aired by TVE until 2017, and the one with the lowest ratings until 2011.

Series 4 (2005)

TVE refused a fourth series, choosing to select its Eurovision Song Contest entry using a multi-artist national final. The show was then offered to Telecinco, who bought its rights. This fourth series started airing in June 2005 and got better ratings than the third one, but it never reached the results that the first series achieved. Runner-up Soraya Arnelas would represent Spain at the Eurovision Song Contest 2009 and sixth-placed Edurne would represent Spain at the Eurovision Song Contest 2015.

Series 5 (2006–07)

Telecinco announced in May 2006 that the fifth series of the program was to be released in October 2006.

In July, 25 Telecinco aired a special show titled Operación Triunfo 2006: Otra Vez en Marcha. In this show some former OT artists (among them, Rosa, Soraya Arnelas, Sergio Rivero, Natalia, Beth) performed and the new selection of contestants was introduced.

The fifth series started on Sunday 8 October 2006 with 18 finalists, but two finalists had to leave and they didn't enter the academy. It created some controversy as one of the first two people out that night was the first black person, Claritzel, ever to be on the show (she had to pull out of the previous year's show). She had to leave the show because of a heart intervention.

Series 6 (2008)

Castings started in Barcelona for the new series on 18 February 2008. The sixth series began on 8 April 2008, with 18 candidates to enter the academy (two of them didn't). This series has been the most controversial because many critics pointed that the series centered more on the reality show aspect than on the contestants' performing talent. Runner-up Pablo López went on to launch a successful recording career in 2014.

Series 7 (2009)

The castings were made in March and April 2009 in all Spain. The first gala from OT 2009 was televised on 29 April 2009. Once again, Risto Mejide was a part of the jury panel, along with Noemí Galera, Coco Comín and Ramoncín.

Series 8 (2011)

This was the last series aired by Telecinco. The show was cancelled after 35 days due to poor ratings. It ended with a rushed finale featuring contestants from previous series. Despite the low ratings, fans of the show made the Twitter hashtag #VivaOT, which went on to be the highest trending topic during the airing of the finale.

Series 9 (2017–18)

Six years after the show was discontinued and thirteen years after it last aired on TVE, RTVE approved to revive the contest. The total cost of the new series was €10,2 million. Casting auditions for the ninth series were held from 14 June 2017 to 18 July 2017 in Barcelona, Las Palmas, Palma, Valencia, Santiago de Compostela, Bilbao, Granada, Seville, and Madrid. The minimum age to compete was raised to 18. On 18 July 2017, Noemí Galera, a member of the jury panel on previous series, was announced as the new "headmaster" of the Academy. On 28 August 2017, it was revealed that the jury panel would consists of singer, songwriter and producer Mónica Naranjo, marketing director Joe Pérez-Orive and music executive and producer Manuel Martos, who would be accompanied every week by a fourth guest juror. On 30 August 2017, Roberto Leal was announced as the new host. The series premiered on 23 October 2017. The final took place on 5 February 2018, and Amaia Romero was announced the winner. In addition, Amaia and Alfred were selected to represent Spain in the Eurovision Song Contest 2018 with "Tu canción", and finished in twenty-third place out of 26 countries.

Series 10 (2018)

On 28 February 2018, RTVE's Governing Board approved the renewal of Operación Triunfo for a tenth series. Casting auditions for the tenth series were held from 30 May 2018 to 10 July 2018 in Barcelona, Alicante, Valencia, Majorca, San Sebastián, Vigo, Tenerife, Málaga, Seville and Madrid. The series premiered on 19 September 2018 and ended on 19 December 2018.

The 18 contestants that appeared on the introduction live show or Gala 0 were announced on 14 September 2018.

As in the previous season, the series served as the platform to select the Spanish entry at the Eurovision Song Contest 2019. A special live show was held on 20 January 2019 to select the Spanish entrant and song for Eurovision.

Series 11 (2020)

In January 2019, TVE confirmed an eleventh series. Casting auditions for the eleventh series were held from 7 October 2019 to 6 November 2019 in Barcelona, Las Palmas, Valencia, Palma, Málaga, Seville, Bilbao, Santiago de Compostela and Madrid. The series premiered on 12 January 2020.

See also
 La Academia
 Fame Academy
 Objetivo Fama
 Star Academy
 Star Académie
 Star Factory

References

External links

Official site 
Operación Triunfo at RTVE.es 
Operación Triunfo in Telecinco 

 
Singing talent shows
Spanish music television series
Spanish reality television series
Eurovision Song Contest selection events
2000s Spanish television series
2010s Spanish television series
2001 Spanish television series debuts
RTVE shows
Telecinco original programming
Television series by Banijay

ca:Operación Triunfo
pt:Operação Triunfo
sr:Операција тријумф